The Ghostzapper Stakes is a Grade III American Thoroughbred horse race for four-years-old and older at a distance of one and one-eighth miles on the dirt run annually in March at Gulfstream Park located in Hallandale Beach, Florida.  The event currently offers a purse of $100,000.

History

The inaugural running of the event was on 26 April 1990 as the Creme Fraiche Stakes over a distance of 7 furlongs and was won by Big Sal ridden US Hall of Fame jockey Earlie Fires by who led all the way in a time of 1:24

The event was named in honor of the 1985 Belmont Stakes winner, Creme Fraiche who also won Grade I Donn Handicap and W.L. McKnight Handicap at Gulfstream Park. 

The following year, 1991 the event's conditions were changed to a handicap and the distance extended to  miles.

In 1993 the American Graded Stakes Committee upgraded the race to Grade III.

In 2003 the event was renamed to the Hal's Hope Handicap after the Florida-bred Hal's Hope who had won the event in 2002 and who also won the 2000 Grade I Florida Derby, 2000 Holy Bull Stakes and the 2002 Grade I Gulfstream Park Handicap.

In 2005 the distance of the event was extended to  miles but after two runnings the distance was decreased to one mile.

In 2009 the conditions of the event were changed to a stakes allowance which reflected in the modification of the event's name.

In 2020 the distance of the event was increased to  miles.

In 2021 the event was renamed to the owner of Gulfstream Park, Frank Stronach's US Hall of Fame and 2004 US Horse of the Year Champion, Ghostzapper as the Ghostzapper Stakes.

Records
Speed  record:
 miles –  	1:48.57  	Badge of Silver  (2005)
 miles – 1:41.49  Geri (1996)
1 mile   – 1:33.87  	Chatain   (2007)

Margins:
 8 lengths   –	K. J.'s Appeal  (1998)

Most wins:
 2 – Chatain (2007, 2008)
 2 – Lea   (2014, 2015)

Most wins by a jockey:
 4 - John R. Velazquez (1998, 2010, 2012, 2019)
 4 - Luis Saez (2013, 2014, 2017, 2022)

Most wins by a trainer:
 5 - Todd A. Pletcher (2010, 2016, 2017, 2019, 2022)

Most wins by an owner:
 2 - Lazy F Ranch  (2007, 2008)
 2 - Claiborne Farm & Adele B. Dilschneider (2014, 2015)

Winners

See also
List of American and Canadian Graded races

References

Horse races in Florida
Graded stakes races in the United States
Recurring sporting events established in 1990
1990 establishments in Florida
Grade 3 stakes races in the United States
Gulfstream Park